Alpayevo (Alpay) is a rural locality (a village) in Ziriklinsky Selsoviet, Sharansky District, Bashkortostan, Russia. The population was 103 as of 2010. There are 2 streets.

Geography 
Alpayevo is located 24 km west of Sharan (the district's administrative centre) by road. Zirikly is the nearest rural locality.

References 

Rural localities in Sharansky District